Salt Rain is the 2001 debut album by Susheela Raman. The album was a Mercury Music Prize nominee.

Track listing
 "Ganapati" (Traditional, Muthuswami Dikshitar; arranged by Sam Mills and Susheela Raman) - 6:42
 "Maya" (Matthew Q. Jones, Sam Mills, Susheela Raman) - 4:36
 "Mamavatu" (Traditional, Sri Vasudevachar; arranged by Sam Mills and Susheela Raman) - 3:52
 "Woman" (Sam Mills, Susheela Raman) - 4:24
 "Mahima" (Traditional, Tyagaraja; arranged by Sam Mills and Susheela Raman) - 7:29
 "Trust in Me" (Richard M. Sherman, Robert B. Sherman) - 3:23
 "Bolo Bolo" (Traditional; arranged by Ayub Ogada and Susheela Raman) - 2:12
 "Salt Rain" (Sam Mills, Susheela Raman) - 4:40
 "Kamakshi" (Traditional, Muthuswami Dikshitar; arranged by Susheela Raman) - 4:52
 "Nagumomo" (Traditional, Tyagaraja; arranged by Sam Mills and Susheela Raman)  - 4:47
 "O Rama" (Traditional, Tyagaraja; arranged by Ayub Ogada, Sam Mills and Susheela Raman) - 4:53
 "Song to the Siren" (Larry Beckett, Tim Buckley) - 6:30

References

2001 debut albums
Susheela Raman albums